β-Cryptoxanthin is a natural carotenoid pigment.  It has been isolated from a variety of sources including the fruit of plants in the genus Physalis, orange rind, papaya, egg yolk, butter, apples, and bovine blood serum.

Chemistry
In terms of structure, β-cryptoxanthin is closely related to β-carotene, with only the addition of a hydroxyl group.  It is a member of the class of carotenoids known as xanthophylls.

In a pure form, β-cryptoxanthin is a red crystalline solid with a metallic luster.  It is freely soluble in chloroform, benzene, pyridine, and carbon disulfide.

Biology and medicine
In the human body, β-cryptoxanthin is converted to vitamin A (retinol) and is, therefore, considered a provitamin A.  As with other carotenoids, β-cryptoxanthin is an antioxidant and may help prevent free radical damage to cells and DNA, as well as stimulate the repair of oxidative damage to DNA.

Recent findings of an inverse association between β-cryptoxanthin and lung cancer risk in several observational epidemiological studies suggest that β-cryptoxanthin could potentially act as a chemopreventive agent against lung cancer.  On the other hand, in the Grade IV histology group of adult patients diagnosed with malignant glioma, moderate to high intake of β-cryptoxanthin (for second tertile and for highest tertile compared to lowest tertile, in all cases) was associated with poorer survival.

Other uses
β-Cryptoxanthin is also used as a substance to colour food products (INS number 161c). It is not approved for use in the EU or USA; however, it is approved for use in Australia and New Zealand.

References

Carotenoids
Tetraterpenes
Cyclohexenes